Skilly may refer to:

Places
Skilly Hills, South Australia, Australia
Skilly Peak, Graham Land, Antarctica

Other uses
Reginald Skilly Williams (1890-1959), English footballer
Skida "Skilly" Thibodeau, a main villain in Prince of Sparta, a science fiction novel by Jerry Pournelle and S. M. Stirling
Skully (game), a children's game also released in 2006 as Skilly
Skilly (food), a broth made from oatmeal and water
Skilly (mythology), a malevolent creature in Cherokee mythology

 Skilly, (training), the act of practising a skill